"Fireman" is a song by American rapper Lil Wayne, released on October 25, 2005, as the first single from his fifth studio album Tha Carter II. The single was produced by American production duo Doe Boyz, composed of Develop and Filthy.

Charts

Weekly charts

Year-end charts

Certifications

References

2005 singles
Lil Wayne songs
Songs written by Lil Wayne
Cash Money Records singles
Trap music songs
2005 songs